"Meditjin" is a song by Indigenous Australian musician Baker Boy featuring New Zealand rapper JessB, released on 21 November 2019 as the second single from his debut album Gela (2021).

"Meditjin" was the recipient of various awards, including Film Clip of the Year and Song of the Year at the 2020 National Indigenous Music Awards and second place in the 2021 Vanda & Young Global Songwriting Competition, and was used in an advertisement for the 2020 AFL season.

The Gabriel Gasparinatos directed music video was nominated for Best Video at the ARIA Music Awards of 2020. At the APRA Music Awards of 2021, the song was shortlisted for Song of the Year.

Background
In a statement, Baker Boy said "Music is the best meditjin (medicine). It brings everyone together, makes you want to dance, love, laugh, vibe and feel and I wrote 'Meditjin' with just that in mind. It's about making people feel the music and expressing themselves."

Release
"Meditjin" was released for digital download and on streaming services on 21 November 2019.

Music video
The music video was released on 4 December 2019, and was directed by Gabriel Gasparinatos.

Synopsis
The video features Baker Boy rapping in his native language of Yolngu Matha as well as English, alongside six barefoot Dancehall Dancers and two members of the Baker Boy family. Baker Boy said: "The video for "Meditjin" was such an exciting process to work through, the concept blew my mind, so I was just so pumped we managed to pull all the elements together. The small things in this video make me so excited, like having my brother, Adam, and cousin, Tristan in the clip. It wasn't really planned but the timing worked out, so it was like 'why not', they were so excited too!"

Critical reception
Christopher Brown from With Guitars said "'Meditjin' is drenched in positive vibes and brings the raw energy of early singles such as "Marryuna", as well as the sound of the Yidaki (aka Didgeridoo) – an instrument that originated with the Yolngu and Galpu people of North East Arnhem Land."

Chart performance
The song peaked at number 1 on the National Indigenous Music Chart.

Awards and nominations
National Indigenous Music Awards

! 
|-
! scope="row" rowspan="2"| 2020
| rowspan="2"| "Meditjin"
| Film Clip of the Year
| rowspan="2" 
| 
|-
| Song of the Year
| 
|}

Vanda & Young Global Songwriting Competition

! 
|-
! scope="row"| 2020
| "Meditjin"
| Global Songwriting Competition
| 
| 
|}

In popular culture
 "Meditjin" was used in advertisements in promotion of the 2020 AFL season.

References

External links
 

2019 singles
2019 songs
Baker Boy songs
JessB songs
Macaronic songs
Songs about Australia
Songs written by Baker Boy
Songs written by Dallas Woods
Songs written by JessB
Songs written by Jerome Farah
Yolngu-language songs